Uganda Technical College, Kichwamba, also referred to as Kichwamba Technical College, is a government-owned, institution of tertiary education in the field of engineering, offering diploma courses.

Location
The coordinates of the College's campus are:0°42'52.0"N, 30°11'28.0"E (Latitude:0.714440; Longitude:30.191107).

History
The institution was established in 1947, as a resettlement of World War II veterans and as an Artisan Training Centre. In 1971, it was upgraded to the level of technical institute and in 1983, it became a technical college.

Kichwamba massacre
On 8 June 1998, rebels affiliated with the terrorist group Allied Democratic Front (ADF) attacked the college and set three dormitories of fire, killing 80 students. The ADF abducted another 100 students and destroyed other property including laboratories and school vehicles.

With the help of the Government of Uganda, the Netherlands Organisation for International Cooperation in Higher Education (Nuffic), Hanze University, Kyambogo University, Mountains of the Moon University and the Government of the Netherlands, the college has recovered and increased the student population to over 650, as at 2010.

See also

References

External links
862 graduate at Kichwamba Technical College - November 2012

Universities and colleges in Uganda
Educational institutions established in 1947
Kabarole District
1947 establishments in Uganda